Wyland may refer to:

Luke Wyland, American musician
Mark Wyland (born 1946), American politician
Ray O. Wyland (1890–1969), American educator
Robert Wyland (born 1956), American painter
Wendy Wyland (1964–2003), American female diver

See also
Wayland (disambiguation)
Weiland (disambiguation)
Weyland (disambiguation)
Wieland (disambiguation)